Hagarenes (or), is a term widely used by early Syriac, Greek, Coptic and Armenian sources to describe the early Arab conquerors of Mesopotamia, Syria and Egypt.

The name was used in Christian literature and Byzantine chronicles for "Hanif" Arabs, and later for Islamic forces as a synonym of the term Saracens. The Syriac term  can be roughly translated as "the followers or descendants of Hagar", while the other frequent name, is thought to have connections with the Arabic , other scholars assume that the terms may not be of Christian origin.  Patricia Crone and Michael Cook claim in their book Hagarism: The Making of the Islamic World was introduced by the Muslims themselves who described their military advance into the Levant and Jerusalem in particular as a Hijra.

The name, used interchangeably with Ishmaelites, came also to mean any Muslim.

See also
 Saracen
 Ishmaelites
 Magarites
 Muhajirun

Notes

References 

 Jewish Encyclopedia: Hagarenes, Hagarites

7th century in the Byzantine Empire
Military history of the Rashidun Caliphate
Ethno-cultural designations
Christianity and Islam
Hagar